The University of Washington Husky Marching Band (Husky Band, or HMB) is the marching band of the University of Washington. A 240-member ensemble, HMB is one of the few bands outside the Big Ten Conference to use the traditional chair step style of marching. The HMB is a year-round ensemble that actively participates in supporting all Husky sports.  Members participate during the fall to help support Husky Football at all home football games and selected away games.  The 2019 season will be the 90th for the HMB.

The Husky Band, under the direction of Bill Bissell, is credited with the invention of the Wave in 1981.

An event for local high school bands, Band Day at Husky football games began in 1950 under Walter C. Welke, then band director.

The HMB is a traveling group, sending many pep bands to away games. The full band has performed at the College Football Hall of Fame in Atlanta, Georgia. and traveled and performed in Japan, China, and Europe. In addition, the HMB plays at various community events around Seattle and does a full show at one local high school once a year. The 2015–2016 season included a trip to Vancouver, B.C. to perform at a B.C. Lions football game as well as a trip to the 2016 Women's Final Four in Indianapolis.

Directors
Walter C. Welke (1929–1956)
Bill Cole (1957–1970)
Bill Bissell (1970–1993)
Dr. Brad McDavid (1994–Present)

Instrumentation

Piccolos
Clarinets
Alto Saxophones
Tenor Saxophones
Mellophones
Trumpets
Trombones
Baritones
Sousaphones
Snares
Basses
Tenors
Cymbals

References

External links
HMB website

College marching bands in the United States
Pac-12 Conference marching bands
Musical groups established in 1929
1929 establishments in Washington (state)
University of Washington organizations